Robin Hull (born 16 August 1974) is a Finnish former professional snooker player.

For some time, he was the sole Nordic player on the game's main tour. He is known as a solid -builder, having compiled over 150 competitive  during his career, among the highest for a player who has never featured in the top 16 in the world rankings.

Hull is one of six players to have missed the final black in attempting a maximum break, alongside Ken Doherty, Thepchaiya Un-Nooh (twice), Barry Pinches, Mark Selby and Liang Wenbo.

Career
A professional since 1992, Hull came to prominence during the 2001–02 season, as he reached the last 16 of the 2001 UK Championship, and later qualified for the 2002 World Championship, knocking out Steve Davis in the final qualifying round; in the first round proper, he lost 6–10 to Graeme Dott. These results allowed Hull to get into the world top 32 at the end of the next season.

A potentially fatal viral infection kept Hull out of much of the 2003–04 season, although he still was able to reach his first ever quarter-final at the 2003 Welsh Open. He later repeated this result at the 2006 Malta Cup. However, his performances were largely inconsistent due to his health issues. He was forced to pull out of qualifying for the 2007 World Championship due to an irregular heartbeat thought to be linked to his past illness. After similar problems in the following season, he decided to retire from professional competition. He started working as a snooker commentator on Finnish Eurosport, and opened a snooker club in his hometown of Espoo.

In February 2010 Hull took part in the pro-am Finnish Snooker Challenge, which featured a number of notable professionals. He impressed, beating Darren Morgan, Ken Doherty and Matthew Stevens on the way to the final, where he lost to Mark Williams. This result encouraged Hull to take part in the Q School tournament in 2011 in attempt to qualify for the 2011–12 main tour, which he did successfully in the first event. Due to lack of sponsorship he only played in a handful of events during the season with his best run coming in qualifying for the 2011 UK Championship in November where he beat Lucky Vatnani and Yu Delu, before losing to Peter Lines 4–6. Hull did not enter another tournament after this and finished the season ranked world number 84, outside of the top 64 who retain their places for the 2012–13 season and therefore did not retain his spot on the main tour. In the 2012–13 season Hull entered qualifying for the World Championship as an amateur, where he lost in the first round of preliminary qualifying 2–5 to Paul Wykes, despite making a 137 break during the match.

Hull regained his main tour place for the 2013–14 season by winning the EBSA European Snooker Championships in Zielona Góra, Poland, beating Welshman Gareth Allen 7–2 in the final, finishing the match with two consecutive centuries. He qualified for the 2013 International Championship by beating Liu Chuang 6–2, although he had to withdraw from the venue stages in China, and came close to beating the reigning world champion Ronnie O'Sullivan in the last 64 of the minor-ranking Kay Suzanne Memorial Cup, losing 4–3 after leading 3–1. However, Hull failed to win any other match at the rest of the tournaments, and due to financial reasons skipped most of the second part of the season until the World Championship, where he delivered his best performances in years. He scored an impressive 10–3 win against Tony Drago in the first round, followed by a 10–6 defeat of Tian Pengfei, and a 10–4 win from 3–0 behind against Ian Burns in round three, to set up a final round match against Peter Ebdon, which Hull won 10–8 to reach the Crucible for the second time in his career. He played O'Sullivan in the last 32 and lost 10–4, despite making a century in one of the frames.

The 2014–15 season began well for Hull. He defeated Xiao Guodong, Graeme Dott and Cao Yupeng to reach the quarter-finals (the third of his professional career and first for eight years) of the 2014 Wuxi Classic where he lost 5–2 to eventual runner-up Joe Perry. Hull won most of his opening round matches in the subsequent tournaments, but failed to progress beyond the last 64 stage until the 2015 China Open where he received a bye to the last 32 after Ronnie O'Sullivan's withdrawal, and defeated Mark King 5–4 to reach the last 16, where he lost 5–1 to Kurt Maflin.

Due to missing most of the previous season, Hull arrived at the season-ending World Championship qualifiers needing a repeat of the previous year's performance to retain his tour card by getting into the top 64 of the world rankings. He did exactly that, as he beat Martin McCrudden, Ben Woollaston and Igor Figueiredo to qualify for the Crucible for the second year in a row. He was defeated 10–3 by Shaun Murphy in the first round, but was ranked 61st in the world afterwards.

Hull did not participate in many tournaments at the start of the 2015–16 season. His first win came at the 2015 UK Championship, where he defeated Zhang Anda 6–4 in the first round, followed by a 6–3 victory over world number eight Barry Hawkins. He was defeated in the third round 6–2 by Luca Brecel, his efforts earning him £9,000. At the Shoot-Out, the tournament in which every match is decided by a single 10-minute frame, Hull won his second professional title by beating Brecel in the final. The winner's prize of £32,000 is the highest pay day of his career.

His Shoot-Out success allowed him to compete in the 2016 Champion of Champions, where he lost 4–2 to Ronnie O'Sullivan in the first round. His only last 16 appearance this year came at the German Masters after he followed qualifying wins over Luca Brecel and Matthew Stevens with a 5–4 victory over Jimmy White, before losing 5–4 to Ryan Day. In the first round of World Championship qualifying, Hull suffered a huge 10–8 shock defeat to 11-time ladies world champion Reanne Evans.

Personal life

Hull was born and raised in Finland, to a Finnish mother and an English father.

Performance and rankings timeline

Career finals

Non-ranking finals: 2 (2 titles)

Pro-am finals: 2 (1 title)

Amateur finals: 12 (11 titles)

References

External links

Robin Hull at worldsnooker.com

1974 births
Living people
Finnish snooker players
Finnish people of English descent
Sportspeople from Espoo
Place of birth missing (living people)